The 2016 Northern Ireland Assembly election was held on Thursday, 5 May 2016. It was the fifth election to take place since the devolved assembly was established in 1998. 1,281,595 individuals were registered to vote in the election (representing an increase of 5.9% compared to the previous Assembly election). Turnout in the 2016 Assembly election was 703,744 (54.9%), a decline of less than one percentage point from the previous Assembly Election in 2011, but down 15 percentage points from the first election to the Assembly held in 1998.

As in the 2007 and 2011 elections, the Democratic Unionist Party and Sinn Féin won the most seats, with the DUP winning 38 and Sinn Féin winning 28 of the available 108 seats. The Ulster Unionist Party won 16 seats, the Social Democratic and Labour Party 12 and the Alliance 8, while two seats were won by the Green Party and People Before Profit. The Traditional Unionist Voice and an independent candidate each won one seat.

Change of date
Under the Northern Ireland Act 1998, elections to the Assembly were originally for a four-year term; thus there would have been an election due in May 2015, four years after the 2011 election. Following the introduction of the UK Fixed Term Parliaments Act, this date would have clashed with the 2015 UK general election. The Scottish Parliament and Welsh Assembly elections were postponed for a year to 2016 to avoid this clash.

In May 2013, Theresa Villiers, Secretary of State for Northern Ireland, announced the next Assembly election would be postponed to May 2016, and would be held at fixed intervals of five years thereafter. Section 7 of the Northern Ireland (Miscellaneous Provisions) Act 2014 specifies that elections will be held on the first Thursday in May on the fifth (rather than fourth, as previously) calendar year following that in which its predecessor was elected.

End of dual mandate
The Northern Ireland (Miscellaneous Provisions) Act 2014 also ends the practice of dual mandate, prohibiting someone being elected to the assembly who is also a member of the House of Commons or Dáil Éireann. At the time the Act was passed, there were three such dual-members: the DUP's Sammy Wilson (MP for East Antrim and MLA for East Antrim) and Gregory Campbell (MP for East Londonderry and MLA for East Londonderry) and the SDLP's Alasdair McDonnell (MP for Belfast South and MLA for Belfast South). Wilson and McDonnell resigned from the Assembly after being re-elected to the House of Commons in the 2015 election. Campbell, who was also re-elected as an MP, is retiring from the Assembly at this election.

Earlier dissolution
There are several circumstances in which the Assembly could be dissolved before the date scheduled by virtue of section 31(1) of the Northern Ireland Act 1998.

Dissolution motion
Under section 32 of the 1998 Act, the Assembly can be dissolved if a resolution to such an effect is passed by the Assembly, with support of 72 or more members.

Failure to elect the First or deputy First Ministers
The Act provides that if the Assembly fails to elect either the First Minister or deputy First Minister within six weeks, an election is called. Since the enactment of the Northern Ireland (St Andrews Agreement) Act 2006, the First Minister has been nominated by the largest party of the largest community designation, and the deputy First Minister has been nominated by the largest party in the second largest community designation ("Nationalist", "Unionist" or "Other").

New Executive Departments
It was proposed that after the May 2016 Election there be a reduction in the number of ministries and departments. The amendments were: 
 The Office of the First Minister and deputy First Minister is renamed the Executive Office
 The Department of Agriculture and Rural Development is renamed the Department of Agriculture, Environment and Rural Affairs
 The Department of Enterprise, Trade and Investment is renamed the Department for the Economy
 The Department of Finance and Personnel is renamed the Department of Finance
 The Department of Health, Social Services and Public Safety is renamed the Department of Health
 The Department for Regional Development is renamed the Department for Infrastructure
 The Department for Social Development is renamed the Department for Communities
 The Department of Justice remains unchanged Department of Justice (Northern Ireland)
 The Department of Culture, Arts and Leisure is dissolved
 The Department of the Environment is dissolved
 The Department for Employment and Learning is dissolved
° The Department of Education remains the same.

Candidates
Nominations opened on 30 March 2016 for the assembly election. A full list of candidates is available.

Parties standing in more than one constituency were:

 Democratic Unionist Party
 Sinn Féin
 Ulster Unionist Party
 Social Democratic and Labour Party
 Alliance
 Traditional Unionist Voice (TUV)
 Green Party
 Progressive Unionist Party
 People Before Profit Alliance
 UKIP
 Cannabis is Safer Than Alcohol
 Conservative
 Northern Ireland Labour Representation Committee
 Cross-Community Labour Alternative
 The Workers Party

Various independents and smaller parties also stood.

Members not seeking re-election

Alliance
 Judith Cochrane (Belfast East)
 Anna Lo (Belfast South)
 Kieran McCarthy (Strangford)

DUP
 Gregory Campbell (East Londonderry)
 Stephen Moutray (Upper Bann)
 Peter Robinson (Belfast East)

NI21
 Basil McCrea (Lagan Valley)

SDLP
 Dominic Bradley (Newry and Armagh)
 John Dallat (East Londonderry)
 Alban Maginness (Belfast North)

Sinn Féin
 Bronwyn McGahan (Fermanagh and South Tyrone)
 Mitchel McLaughlin (South Antrim)

UUP
 Leslie Cree (North Down)
 Sam Gardiner (Upper Bann)
 Michael McGimpsey (Belfast South)

UKIP
 David McNarry (Strangford)

Results

The 2016 election was held using STV and 18 multi-seat districts, each electing 6 members.

Distribution of seats by constituency

Party affiliation of the six Assembly members returned by each constituency. The first column indicates the party of the Member of the House of Commons (MP) returned by the corresponding parliamentary constituency in the general election of 7 May 2015 (under the "first past the post" method).

(The constituencies are arranged here in rough geographical order around Lough Neagh from Antrim to Londonderry. To see them in alphabetical order, click the small square icon after "Constituency"; to restore this geographical order, click the icon after "No." at the left.)

 Three of the four independents elected in 1998 ran as Independent Unionists
  NIWC = Northern Ireland Women's Coalition; Prog. U. = Progressive Unionist Party; TUV = Traditional Unionist Voice; UKUP = United Kingdom Unionist Party

Share of first-preference votes
Percentage of each constituency's first-preference votes. Four highest percentages in each constituency shaded; absolute majorities underlined. The constituencies are arranged in the geographic order described for the table above; click the icon next to "Constituency" to see them in alphabetical order. 
[The totals given here are the sum of all valid ballots cast in each constituency, and the percentages are based on such totals. The turnout percentages in the last column, however, are based upon all ballots cast, which also include anything from twenty to a thousand invalid ballots in each constituency. The total valid ballots' percentage of the eligible electorate can correspondingly differ by 0.1% to 2% from the turnout percentage.] 
 

 Independent Unionist vote in 1998 (2.8%) included in the Independent column (not "others"). TUV = Traditional Unionist Voice.

Incumbents defeated

Sinn Féin
Rosie McCorley — Belfast West
Maeve McLaughlin — Foyle
Cathal Ó hOisín — East Londonderry
Phil Flanagan — Fermanagh and South Tyrone

Democratic Unionist Party
Jonathan Craig — Lagan Valley
Ian McCrea — Mid Ulster
David McIlveen — North Antrim

Ulster Unionist Party
Alastair Patterson — Fermanagh and South Tyrone
Adrian Cochrane-Watson - South Antrim

Social Democratic and Labour Party
Dolores Kelly — Upper Bann
Gerard Diver — Foyle
Karen McKevitt — South Down (stood in Newry and Armagh)
Fearghal McKinney — Belfast South
Seán Rogers — South Down

Independent
John McCallister — South Down

Opinion Polling

Graphical summary

References

Manifestos
 Manifesto 2016, Alliance
 Our Plan for Northern Ireland, Democratic Unionist Party
 A Zero Waste Strategy for Northern Ireland, Green Party Northern Ireland
 Better With Sinn Féin, Sinn Féin
 Build a Better Future, Social Democratic and Labour Party
 Straight Talking Principled Politics, Traditional Unionist Voice
 Northern Ireland Assembly Manifesto 2016, Democratic Unionist Party
 It's Time For Real Change, UK Independence Party
 Standing Against Austerity, Workers' Party

2016
2016 elections in the United Kingdom
May 2016 events in the United Kingdom
2016 elections in Northern Ireland